Morehouse is a surname. Notable people with the surname include:

 Albert P. Morehouse (1835–1891), 26th Governor of Missouri 
 David Morehouse (born 1960), President and Chief Executive Officer of Pittsburgh Penguins of the National Hockey League
 Henry Lyman Morehouse (1834–1917), American Baptist minister and hymn author
 Jim Morehouse (1864–1914), Australian rules footballer
 Lyda Morehouse (born 1967), American science fiction and fantasy author
 Oscar E. Morehouse (1857–1935), Canadian politician and doctor
 Tim Morehouse (born 1978), American fencer
 Ward Morehouse (1895–1966), American theater critic, newspaper columnist, playwright and author
 Ward Morehouse (activist) (1929–2012), anti-corporate activist

See also
 Moorehouse (surname)
 Moorhouse (surname)

English-language surnames